DateMySchool is an online dating platform targeted toward university students and alumni. It requires a university email address, and claims that it permits only verified students and alumni to join. It allows users to filter by schools, departments, individuals and other groups from accessing their profiles - subject to the same security policy based on university email addresses. The site does not index profiles on Google.

Site registration is free, but members are prompted to sign up for a subscription if they visit their inbox.

History 

DateMySchool was co-founded by Columbia University M.B.A. students Balazs Alexa and Jean Meyer on November 8, 2010, after a woman in the School of Social Work complained that there were too few men in her department. DateMySchool first expanded to New York University; University of California, Berkeley; Stanford, Harvard, and Massachusetts Institute of Technology;  and then spread to 350 schools before launching to more than 1,000 schools nationwide.

Privacy 

DateMySchool members may exclude schools, departments, and individuals. By default, members will not be seen by their classmates as they are invisible to their department and their department is invisible to them. However, they may change their privacy settings to allow members from their department to see them.  Alexa and Meyer claim that by enabling users to choose who can and cannot view their profiles the site attempts to minimize the stigma of online dating.

Acquisition tactics 
DateMySchool has a campus ambassador program for which they hire students across the United States to promote the website on campus. Students are paid based on the number of signups generated from their respective campuses. DateMySchool also has an anonymous invite module that allows a user to invite their friends and classmates. Users have the option to input an individual email address or invite their whole contact list.

While users are permitted to send invitations to any email address, the recipient of the invitation must be able to complete the verification process to confirm they are a student or alumni, otherwise, the recipient will be unable to sign up.

References

Online dating services of the United States
Internet properties established in 2010